The Festival de Bomba y Plena de San Antón (English: San Anton’s Bomba and Plena Festival), is an annual celebration held in Ponce, Puerto Rico, as an extravaganza celebration of Bomba and Plena music genres and the traditions of Ponce's barrio San Antón. The celebration lasts 10 days and it ends on a Sunday. It is generally held in July but sometimes in November.

History 
The festival started in 1978. It started when Barrio San Antón residents united to oppose plans by municipal authorities to re-zonify the San Antón area that would had resulted in the replacement of their existing mix of wooden and concrete neighborhood homes and the construction, instead, of multi-story residential buildings. The festival had a 10-year hiatus from 1998 to 2008. It is held at placita Pedro Arce of Barrio San Antón, Ponce, Puerto Rico.

The festival generated tremendous interest, and other Puerto Rico municipalities have started their own bomba and plena festivals, including Dorado, Aguas Buenas, Loiza, and Mayagüez. In 2010, the Puerto Rico legislative assembly declared Barrio San Antón a historic site and the "cradle of Plena music".

Venues 
The festival takes place at Placita Pedro Arce in Barrio San Anton. At times the venue for the activity has been changed to other locations in the municipality, such as Paseo Tablado La Guancha.

See also

 Feria de Artesanías de Ponce
 Carnaval de Ponce
 Ponce Jazz Festival
 Fiesta Nacional de la Danza
 Día Mundial de Ponce
 Festival Nacional de la Quenepa
 Bienal de Arte de Ponce
 Carnaval de Vejigantes
 Festival Nacional Afrocaribeño

References

External links 

July events
November events
Carnivals in Puerto Rico
Annual events in Puerto Rico
Recurring events established in 1978
Festivals in Ponce, Puerto Rico
1978 establishments in Puerto Rico
Events in Ponce, Puerto Rico